Sollefteå is a locality and the seat of Sollefteå Municipality in Västernorrland County, Sweden with 8,562 inhabitants in 2010.

The earliest written account on Sollefteå is found in a script dating back to 1270. During this time the name of the village was given as De Solatum - a name that can be interpreted as a composition of Sol (sun) and at (property) i.e. literally The sunlit region. De Solatum also can be interpreted as desolation, which means loneliness or remoteness (see Remote and isolated community).

With Sollefteå being located at the lowest rapids of the Ångermanälven thereby making it the last outpost to which it was possible to sail. The village developed into a municipality. The town changed from a commercial town into a town dominated by the military when the two regiments T 3 (Logistics) and I 21 (Infantry) were located there in 1898 and 1911 respectively.

In 1902 Sollefteå obtained the status of market town or köping before finally being granted a town charter in 1917 thereby making it a city.

It is now the seat of the much larger Sollefteå Municipality. Sollefteå is, despite its small population, for historical reasons normally still referred to as a city.

Notable buildings

The pharmacy 
The pharmacy building was erected in 1889. It is a brick building, two and a half storeys high. The style of the building is influenced by the late 19th-century architectural style and is dominated by the neo-Gothic style. The house was designed by the architect Niclas Wahrgren.

The many various architectural styles represented in the building is seen in the medieval inspired crenellated corner tower, Norman arches, North German gothic styles, blind windows with pointed arches and portico supported by columns. There are also renaissance elements in the design, for example the staircase's orientalic/antique and geometric mosaics with meanders. The overall style of the building is reminiscent of the palatial buildings erected on Strandvägen in Stockholm and in the Stenstaden in Sundsvall at the same time.

In 1984, the building was declared a historic building and thereby protected from demolition or major alterations. It is today the home of the local library as well as the city's museum.

Hotel Appelbergs 
The hotel is located in the centre of Sollefteå, along the pedestrian district. It is also the oldest hotel in the city, built in 1882 by timberman and innkeeper Erik Appelberg.

The hotel became a hub for timber-merchants as well as local potentates. Notable guests include Crown Princess Stéphanie of Austria, King Oscar II and Gustav V of Sweden, and Kaiser Wilhelm II. The hotel also provided accommodation for King Chulalongkorn of Siam and four of his princes during their tour of Ångermanland in the early 20th century. Their journey is commemorated in the hotel with a plaque, and in the village of Utanede with a royal pavilion.

The building is a good example of the early architecture of Sollefteå, being built of wood.

Sollefteå Church

Multrå transmitter 
A facility for FM/TV broadcasting with a 288 metre tall mast.

Climate
The station's slightly more southerly latitude is likely even exceeded by a 50–80 metres higher elevation depending on location within Sollefteå. This likely renders Sollefteå slightly milder, particularly during afternoons.

Österforse has a subarctic climate (Dfc) that is quite moderate in nature considering its inland position and latitude. Summer days are very warm for North Central Sweden, being heavily affected by its low elevation in comparison to areas further west such as Östersund. Temperatures are heavily dependent on wind direction and the convergences of warm southerly and cold northerly air. Temperature inversion is also a factor due to its position beneath the mountain range.

Sports
The following sports clubs are located in Sollefteå:

 Sollefteå GIF official website (Swedish)
 Sollefteå Hockey official website (Swedish)
 Remsle UIF official website (Swedish)
 Sollefteå Handboll handball official website (Swedish)
 Sollefteå BTK Table tennis official website (Swedish)

Notable people from Sollefteå 
Helena Jonsson, 1984-, biathlete
Emma Johansson, 1983-, cyclist. Won two Olympic silver medals.
Pelle Svensson, 1943-, lawyer and distinguished wrestler 
Ulf Eriksson, 1942-association football referee
Mona Sahlin, 1957-, former chairman of Swedish Social Democratic Party and Member of Parliament 
Urban Bäckström, 1955-, former Governor of the Bank of Sweden, president of the Confederation of Swedish Enterprise 
Ingrid Thulin, 1926-2004, actress 
Marie-Helene Östlund, 1966-, skier
Per Svartvadet, 1975-, ice-hockey player
Mattias Timander, 1974-, ice-hockey player
Therese Sjölander, 1981-, ice-hockey player
Helen Svedin, 1976, supermodel, wife of Luís Figo
Frida Karlsson, 1999-, cross-country skier
Lennart Ljung, 1921-1990, former Supreme Commander Of The Swedish Armed Forces

Sister city
 Madison, Mississippi

Madison has been Sollefteå's sister city since 1997. Talks began in 1995 when Madison officials were meeting with the board of Sollefteå-based forestry products company, Haglof, Inc, for the latter was interested in opening a plant in Madison. The Madison officials came to Sollefteå and were more interested to learn about Swedish culture.

A delegation of 30 members of the city of Sollefteå's board came to Madison to tour the city and make the sister city relationship official.
During the visit, Haglof opened its new office in Madison, and another Swedish company, Mini Tube, was also interested in opening offices in Madison.

After the people of the delegation of Sollefteå came to Madison, the latter sent 34 delegates to Sollefteå, once again to tour the city. The Madison delegates learned about Swedish culture and traditions, came to Haglof Inc.'s facilities, and toured an environmental center.

Because of Sollefteå's and Madison's relationship, the Swedish-American Chamber of Commerce was created in the latter.

Gallery

References 

 
Populated places in Sollefteå Municipality
Ångermanland
Municipal seats of Västernorrland County
Swedish municipal seats
Diocese of Härnösand

fi:Sollefteån kunta